"Behind Closed Doors" is a country song written by Kenny O'Dell. It was first recorded by Charlie Rich for his 1973 album Behind Closed Doors. The single was Rich's first number-one hit on the country charts, spent 20 weeks on this chart, and was also a crossover hit on the pop charts.  It was certified Platinum by the RIAA for U. S. sales in excess of two million copies. Background vocals were provided by The Nashville Edition.

Rich's producer, Billy Sherrill, encouraged O'Dell to write music for the singer. O'Dell recalled the creation of "Behind Closed Doors" to Tom Roland in The Billboard Book of Number One Country Hits. "It was just a title I had written down, and I had a little guitar riff that I'd carried with me for a couple of years. The chorus was pretty much a little deviation on that." Sherrill later changed some lines at the end of the second verse, but some radio stations banned the record initially as being racy.

"Behind Closed Doors" earned awards for Song of the Year for O'Dell and Single of the Year for Rich from both the Country Music Association and the Academy of Country Music. Both O'Dell and Rich also received a Grammy Awards for "Behind Closed Doors: Best Country Song for O'Dell and Best Country Vocal Performance, Male for Rich. In 2003, it ranked #9 in CMT's 100 Greatest Songs in Country Music.

Chart performance
Charlie Rich

Diana Ross

Cover versions
Numerous other artists have covered the song "Behind Closed Doors", using the original or slightly modified lyrics.  For example, Loretta Lynn and Dolly Parton sang versions in which the genders were reversed and a few words changed or added, while Diana Ross sang a version with both gender change and added lines.  Ross's version reached #14 in South Africa.

Other artists who covered this song include Bettye LaVette, Ronnie Milsap, Hank Thompson, Cal Smith, Perry Como, Percy Sledge, Little Milton, Mike Cooley, Stan Ridgway, Tom Jones, Bobby Womack, and Buddy Jewell.

Joe Diffie covered the song on the 1998 album Tribute to Tradition. His version peaked at number 64 on the Billboard Hot Country Singles & Tracks chart.

References

1973 songs
1973 singles
1974 singles
Charlie Rich songs
Diana Ross songs
Songs written by Kenny O'Dell
Song recordings produced by Billy Sherrill
Epic Records singles
Joe Diffie songs